"White Love" is a single by Japanese girl group Speed. It was released on October 15, 1997. It was number-one on the Oricon Weekly Singles Chart. It was the 10th best-selling single in Japan in 1997, with 1.164 million copies sold and it has sold a total of 1.845 million copies.

In 2012, Su-metal of the kawaii metal group Babymetal performed a cover during their Legend "D" show at Akasaka Blitz, which coincided with her 15th birthday. The song was chosen because it was a hit in 1997, the year of her birth. In 2022, the J-pop duo ClariS performed a cover for their mini-album Winter Tracks.

Track listing
All songs are written by Hiromasa Ijichi; all music is arranged by Yasutaka Mizushima.

Weekly charts

References

1997 singles
1997 songs
Japanese-language songs
Oricon Weekly number-one singles
Toy's Factory singles
Speed (Japanese band) songs
Songs with lyrics by Hiromasa Ijichi
Songs with music by Hiromasa Ijichi